"Clash City Rockers" is a song by English rock band the Clash. It was first released in February 1978 as a single with the B-side "Jail Guitar Doors", the latter a re-worked version of a song from Joe Strummer's pub rock days. "Clash City Rockers" was the second of three non-album singles released between the group's eponymous first album in 1977 and their second album, Give 'Em Enough Rope (1978). It was later included as the opening track of the belated US version of the band's debut album.

Background
The song was first played live at Mont De Marsan (Landes, France), in August 1977, and recorded the same year in the band's October and November sessions at CBS Studios. Following an argument at the end of the band's Get Out of Control Tour, Paul Simonon and Mick Jones were not on speaking terms, leaving Joe Strummer as a middle-man, relaying instructions and insults from one to the other.

Composition
The Clash's first overt attempt at self-mythology, "Clash City Rockers" is, by and large, a song about positivity and moving forward, and revisits themes common in Clash songs of the era, specifically dead-end employment and having a purpose in life. 

The middle part of the song is based on an old nursery rhyme, "Oranges and Lemons" ("You owe me a move say the bells of St. Groove"), and namechecks David Bowie, Gary Glitter and Prince Far-I. The irony of the line "when I am fitter say the bells of Gary Glitter" following Glitter's later scandal was not lost on Jones, who joked about it in the December 2003 issue of Uncut magazine: "The Gary Glitter lyric? Yeah, that was before the internet. [grins]"

The line in the song about reggae artist Prince Far-I, "No one but you and I say the bells of Prince Far-I", once again shows the group's reggae influences. According to Strummer, the "rockers" in the song are not rock 'n' rollers: "I was talking about rockers which is a certain reggae rhythm".

Despite the reggae references, "Clash City Rockers" is a punk rock song with similarities to early songs by the Who. It reinforced the profile and image of the Clash and their fans as being a gang.

Recording
In December, producer Mickey Foote—Strummer's old sound-man from the 101'ers and producer of The Clash and "White Riot"—increased the speed of the tape for the finished master of the song, after manager Bernie Rhodes decided the song sounded "a bit flat". This technique, known as "varispeeding", rendered the song one semitone higher in pitch. Strummer and Jones were in Jamaica at the time, and when they heard the finished result, they fired Foote. With the exception of the 2000 re-issue of the US version of The Clash, the original version of the song (at the proper speed) has been used on every re-release since.

Track listing
 7" vinyl
 "Clash City Rockers" – 3:50
 "Jail Guitar Doors" – 3:03

Personnel
The Clash
Joe Strummer – lead vocal, pianos
Mick Jones – guitars, backing vocals
Paul Simonon – bass guitar
Topper Headon – drums

Charts

References

Sources

1977 songs
1978 singles
The Clash songs
Songs written by Joe Strummer
Songs written by Mick Jones (The Clash)
CBS Records singles